Mickiewicz is a Polish form of the Belarusian surname Mickievič. It corresponds to Lithuanianized: Mickevičius, and Belarusian, Russian: Mitskevich.
Notable people with this surname include:

Adam Mickiewicz (1798-1855),  Polish poet, dramatist, essayist, publicist, translator, professor of Slavic literature, and political activist, regarded as national poet in Poland, Lithuania and Belarus 
Denis Mickiewicz (born 1929), Professor Emeritus of Russian Literature at Duke University and the founding conductor of the Yale Russian Chorus
Jacek Mickiewicz (born 1970), Polish road racing cyclist
Matt Mickiewicz (born 1983),  internet entrepreneur
Mieczysław Mickiewicz (1879-1939), Ukrainian politician and lawyer of Polish descent, statesman of the Second Polish Republic
Wincenty Mickiewicz (1882–1954), writer

See also
Mickiewicz (crater), on Mercury
List of things named after Adam Mickiewicz

References

Polish-language surnames